Roger Woodhouse ( – 1588), of Kimberley, Norfolk, was an English politician.

He was a Member of parliament (MP) of the Parliament of England for Aldeburgh, for Norfolk in 1572 and for Thetford in 1586.

References

1541 births
1588 deaths
People from Aldeburgh
People from Thetford
People from Kimberley, Norfolk
English MPs 1572–1583
English MPs 1586–1587
Members of Parliament for Norfolk